Joseph Cheney Bolton (1819 – 14 March 1901) was a Scottish merchant and a Liberal Party politician.

As a partner in the firm of Ker, Bolton, & Co., East India merchants, of Glasgow and London, he was a J.P. for Stirlingshire and Lanarkshire.

At the 1874 general election Bolton stood unsuccessfully for Parliament in the Glasgow constituency, where he won less than 1% of the votes. However, at the next general election, 1880, he was elected as the Member of Parliament (MP) for Stirlingshire. He held the seat until he stood down at the 1892 general election.

Bolton died at the age of 81.

References

External links 

1819 births
1901 deaths
Scottish Liberal Party MPs
Members of the Parliament of the United Kingdom for Scottish constituencies
UK MPs 1880–1885
UK MPs 1885–1886
UK MPs 1886–1892
Members of the Parliament of the United Kingdom for Stirling constituencies